Malang may refer to:
Maleng language, a Vietic language of Laos and Vietnam
Dusun Malang language, a language spoken by the Dusun people of Borneo